Caio Rosa Alves (born 9 March 2001) is a Brazilian footballer who plays as a forward.

Career

Cruzeiro
Rosa was promoted to Cruzeiro's senior team after his good performances at the 2020 Copa São Paulo de Futebol Júnior. He made his professional debut on January 29, 2020 coming in the 61st minute of the match against Villa Nova at 2020 Campeonato Mineiro. Due to Cruzeiro's hard financial and administrative situation, which resulted in several coach's change, Rosa was promoted and demoted to youth teams several times along that year. In September, after several good performances at the Campeonato Brasileiro Sub-20, Rosa was definitely promoted to the senior team. On October 1, he debuted at the 2020 Campeonato Brasileiro Série B coming in the 56th minute of the match against Ponte Preta. On October 5, Rosa signed with UAE Pro League's team Sharjah FC for a US$600,000 fee.

Career statistics

Club

Notes

References

External links
 

2001 births
Living people
Brazilian footballers
Brazilian expatriate footballers
Association football forwards
Cruzeiro Esporte Clube players
Sharjah FC players
Khor Fakkan Sports Club players
Campeonato Brasileiro Série B players
UAE Pro League players
Expatriate footballers in the United Arab Emirates
Brazilian expatriate sportspeople in the United Arab Emirates
People from Barra Mansa